The 2011–12 Cypriot First Division was the 73rd season of the Cypriot top-level football league. It began on 27 August 2011 and ended on 12 May 2012. APOEL were the defending champions. AEL Limassol won the championship one matchweek before the end of the season.

The league comprise eleven teams from the 2010–11 season and three promoted teams from the 2010–11 Second Division.

Teams
Doxa Katokopias and APOP Kinyras were relegated at the end of the first stage of the 2010–11 season after finishing in the bottom two places of the table. They were joined by AEP Paphos, who finished at the bottom of the second-phase Group C.

The relegated teams were replaced by 2010–11 Second Division champions Aris Limassol, runners-up Nea Salamis Famagusta and third-placed team Anagennisi Dherynia.

Personnel and kits

Note: Flags indicate national team as has been defined under FIFA eligibility rules. Players and Managers may hold more than one non-FIFA nationality.

Managerial changes

First round

Second round

Group A

Group B

Group C

Season statistics

Top goalscorers
Source: Cyprus Football AssociationHat-tricks

 5 Player scored 5 goals.

Scoring

First goal of the season: 10th minute –  Edmar for AEL against Nea Salamina (19:10, 28 August 2011)
Fastest goal of the season: 37 seconds –  Mato Šimunović (Anagennisi) against Apollon (11 September 2011)
Latest goal of the season: 97 minutes and 34 seconds –  Christos Karipidis (Omonia) against Ethnikos (4 March 2012)
First own goal of the season:  Bojan Markovski (Enosis) for Anorthosis (17 September 2011)
First scored penalty kick of the season:  Hristijan Kirovski (Apollon) against Anagennisi Dherynia (11 September 2011)
Most scored goals in a single fixture – 23 goals (Fixture 20)
Fixture 20 results: AEK 2–1 Omonia, Anorthosis 0–1 AEL, APOEL 2–1 Ethnikos, Apollon 3–2 Nea Salamina, Anagennisi 1–2 Alki, Ermis 1–5 Aris, Olympiakos 2–0 Enosis.

Discipline

 First yellow card of the season:  Danny Invincible for Ermis against Apollon, 7 minutes (28 August 2011)
 First red card of the season:  Solomon Grimes for Nea Salamina against AEL, 90 minutes and 44 seconds (28 August 2011)
 Most yellow cards in a single match: 10
 Anorthosis 2–2 Aris – 4 for Anorthosis (Marquinhos, Jurgen Colin, Igor Tomašić and Evandro Roncatto) and 6 for Aris (Andreas Theofanous, Andrés Imperiale, Christos Charalampous, Carl Lombé, Claudiu Ionescu and Zoltán Kovács) (19 September 2011'')

Sources

References

Cypriot First Division seasons
Cyprus
1